Yamaha YZE 850T was a twin cylinder rally raid bike, produced from 1992 to 1998 with the specific task of winning the Dakar Rally, that won six times in seven years.

See also
 Yamaha XT660Z Ténéré
 Yamaha XT1200Z Super Ténéré

References

External links
 Ténéré - Yamaha Motor Global
 Le Regine della Dakar 

YZE 850T
Off-road motorcycles
Motorcycles introduced in 1992
Rally raid bikes